Frédéric-Nicolas Duvernoy (16 October 1765, in Montbéliard – 19 July 1838, in Paris) was a French composer and hornist.

Biography 
In 1788, Duvernoy went to Paris and became a hornist at Orchestre de la Comédie italienne. On April 1, 1790 Duvernoy joined Orchestre de la Garde Nationale. Later, in 1795, he became professor of horn at the Paris Conservatoire and served until October 1815. He was also a member of Orchestre de l'Opéra de Paris between September 1796 and July 1817.

He will be member of La Chapelle de l'empereur Napoléon Ier where, with his brother Charles-Frédéric (clarinet), he will very closed with brothers Rodolphe and Jean Nicolas Auguste Kreutzer (violin), Delcambre (bassoon) and Dalvimare (harp).

Musical works 
 Concerto n°  1 pour cor et orchestre
 Concerto n°  2 pour cor et orchestre
 Concerto n°  3 pour cor et orchestre
 Concerto n°  4 pour cor et orchestre
 Concerto n°  5 pour cor et orchestre (with François Devienne)
 Concerto n°  6 pour cor et orchestre
 Concerto n°  7 pour cor et orchestre
 Concerto n°  8 pour cor et orchestre
 Concerto n°  9 pour cor et orchestre
 Concerto n° 10 pour cor et orchestre
 Concerto n° 11 pour cor et orchestre
 Concerto n° 12 pour cor et orchestre
 Trio pour cor, violon et piano n° 1
 Trio pour cor, violon et piano n° 2
 Trio pour cor, violon et piano n° 3
 Nocturne n° 1 pour cor et piano
 Nocturne n° 2 pour cor et piano
 Nocturne n° 3 pour cor et piano
 Nocturne pour cor et harpe n° 2 en mi bémol majeur
 Quintette pour cor, deux violon alto et basse n° 1
 Quintette pour cor, deux violon alto et basse n° 2
 Quintette pour cor, deux violon alto et basse n° 3
 Pas de manœuvre (for harmony orchester)
 Marche du sacre de Napoléon Ier
 Intermezzo pour flûte, opus 41 n° 2
 Sonate n° 1 pour cor et violoncelle
 Sonate n° 2 pour cor et violoncelle, en fa majeur
 Etudes faciles pour piano et orchestre, opus 176
 Symphonie concertante pour cor, harpe et orchestre
 20 duos pour deux cors, opus 3
 4 trios pour trois cors
 Concertino pour flûte et piano
 Douze Fantaisies pour cor et piano (or orgel)
 Quatre Divertissements pour cor et piano
 Fantaisie pour piano et cor (our alt) onto a thema by Jean-Jacques Rousseau
 Trois Sérénades pour piano et cor
 Duo pour cor et piano, published into Manuel anacréontique des Francs Maçons (Éditions des Frères Gaveau)

Other works 
 Méthode pour le cor 1802
 Leçons manuscrites de solfège, volume 1
 Leçons manuscrites de solfège, volume 2

Sources 
 Biographie universelle des musiciens de François-Joseph Fétis
 A biographical dictionary of musicians, Theodore Baker (1900)
 Le Conservatoire National de Musique Et de Déclamation Documents Historiques Et Administratifs by Constant Pierre

External links 
 Authority control : Fichier d'autorité international virtuel • International Standard Name Identifier • Bibliothèque nationale de France • Bibliothèque du Congrès • Gemeinsame Normdatei • WorldCat

1765 births
1838 deaths
Concert band composers
People from Montbéliard
Academic staff of the Conservatoire de Paris
French classical horn players
French classical composers
French male classical composers